Article spinning is a writing technique used in search engine optimization (SEO), and other applications, which creates what deceitfully appears to be new content from what already exists. Content spinning works by replacing specific words, phrases, sentences, or even entire paragraphs with any number of alternate versions, in order to provide a slightly different variation with each spin — also known as Rogeting. This process can be completely automated or written manually as many times as needed. Early content produced through automated methods often resulted in articles which were hard or even impossible to read. However, as article-spinning techniques were refined they became more sophisticated, and can now result in readable articles which, upon cursory review, can appear original. 

The practice is sometimes considered falling under the category of spamdexing, a black hat SEO practice, given that no genuinely new content is created. Website authors use article spinning to reduce the similarity ratio of rather redundant pages or pages with minimal or meaningless or uninformative content, and to avoid penalties in the search engine results pages (SERPs) for using duplicate content. 
  
Article spinning is also used in other types of applications, such as message personalization and chatbots.  
  
Regardless of the application, the end result is a proliferation of documents that are all similar but are superficially disguised as being different.  The spin-generated documents can prove uninformative to the reader, thereby infuriating the end user.

Automatic spinning
Automatic rewriting can change the meaning of a sentence through the use of words with similar but subtly different meaning to the original. For example, the word "picture" could be replaced by the word "image" or "photo". Thousands of word-for-word combinations are stored in either a text file or database thesaurus to draw from. This ensures that a large percentage of words are different from the original article.

The problem with simple automatic writing is that it cannot recognize context or grammar in the use of words and phrases. Poorly-done article spinning can result in unidiomatic phrasing that no human writer would choose. Some spinning may substitute a synonym with the wrong part of speech when encountering a word that can be used as either a noun or a verb, use an obscure word that is only used within very specific contexts, or improperly substitute proper nouns. For example, "Great Britain" could be auto spun to "Good Britain". While "good" could be considered a synonym for "great", "Good Britain" does not have the same meaning as "Great Britain".

Article spinning can use a variety of methods; a straightforward one is "spintax". Spintax (or spin syntax) uses a marked-up version of text to indicate which parts of the text should be altered or rearranged. The different variants of one paragraph, one or several sentences, or groups of words or words are marked. This spintax can be extremely rich and complex, with many depth levels (nested spinning). It acts as a tree with large branches, then many smaller branches up to the leaves. To create readable articles out of spintax, a specific software application chooses any of the possible paths in the tree; this results in wide variations of the base article without significant alteration to its meaning.
  
As of 2017, there are a number of websites which will automatically spin content for an author, often with the end goal of attracting viewers to a website in order to display advertisements to them.

Manual spinning
Because of the problems with automated spinning, website owners may pay writers or specific companies to perform higher quality spinning manually. Writers may also spin their own articles, allowing them to sell the same articles with slight variations to a number of clients or to use the article for multiple purposes, for example as content and also for article marketing.

Plagiarism and duplicate content
Google representatives say that Google doesn't penalize websites that host duplicate content, but the advances in filtering techniques mean that duplicate content will rarely feature well in SERPs, which is a form of penalty. In 2010 and 2011, changes to Google's search algorithm targeting content farms aim to penalize sites containing significant duplicate content. In this context, article spinning might help, as it's not detected as duplicate content.

Criticisms

Article spinning is a way to create what looks like new content from existing content. As such, it can be seen as unethical, whether it is paraphrasing of copyrighted material (to try to evade copyright), deceiving readers into wasting their time for the benefit of the spinner (while not providing additional value to them), or both.

References

Search engine optimization